Hulldale is an unincorporated community in Schleicher County, Texas, United States.  Its elevation is 2,201 ft (671 m).  It lies north of Eldorado, the county seat of Schleicher County.

References

Unincorporated communities in Schleicher County, Texas
Unincorporated communities in Texas